Inês Thomas Almeida (born 11 June 1976 in Santo Domingo, Dominican Republic) is a Dominican Republic-born Portuguese musicologist, lyric singer (mezzo-soprano) and former founder of the NGO Berlinda  currently living in Berlin.

Life and career 
Ines Thomas Almeida was born in the Dominican Republic and grew up in Portugal as a bilingual and with double nationality. After studying Piano in Lisbon she entered the University of Évora to study singing, where she was twice awarded "Best Student of the University" in two consecutive years.

She then moved to Germany and studied voice with Klaus Häger at the Rostock University of Music and Theater, having graduated there in 2007. As a member of the Opera Studio she performed several roles, such as the main role in Orfeo ed Euridice from Christoph Willibald Gluck and  Zia Principessa in Suor Angelica from Giacomo Puccini. She also took masterclasses with Teresa Berganza, Krisztina Laki, Hanna Schwarz, Jill Feldman, Claudia Eder and Norman Shetler. She also performed as a soloist in many concerts in Germany.

In 2008 she was prizewinner of the International Singing Contest Kammeroper Schloss Rheinsberg, in which participated more than 450 candidates from 40 countries. As a prizewinner she sang in many productions at the Schloss Rheinsberg Opera. She also performed in the  "Rheinsberger Sängernacht" with Arias from the Opera Carmen from Georges Bizet. She is a scholarship holder of the Yehudi Menuhin Live Music Now Foundation.

In February 2009, invited by the Embassy of the Dominican Republic in Portugal, she performed with great success the recital Poema en Forma de Canciones at the Palácio Foz in Lisbon with art songs of Ibero-American composers.

She performed regularly in Portugal, in the Dominican Republic and in Germany.

In 2011 she created the NGO Berlinda, for the awareness, in Berlin, of the culture of Portuguese-speaking countries and for social help to the Portuguese community in Berlin.

In 2016 she returned to Portugal, where she is currently an integrated researcher at the Faculty of Social and Human Sciences in Lisbon. She holds a PhD in Historical Musicology from Universidade Nova de Lisboa and was awarded for her dissertation the highest classification unanimously. Her main research interests are music in the 18th century, modern travel literature, women and music, proto-feminisms, transnational cultural networks, and German, Austrian and Portuguese connections in the 18th century. Ines Thomas Almeida currently engages as a music lecturer at the Universidade Nova de Lisboa, Lisbon Opera House and the Calouste Gulbenkian Foundation.

References

External links 
 Official Webpage from Ines Thomas Almeida

1982 births
Living people
Dominican Republic emigrants to Portugal
People from Santo Domingo
Operatic mezzo-sopranos
Portuguese mezzo-sopranos
Rostock University of Music and Theatre alumni
White Dominicans
21st-century Portuguese women opera singers